Michael Wayne Moore (born November 26, 1959), is a former Major League Baseball pitcher.

Moore pitched for Oral Roberts University, going 28–11 with an ERA of 2.64. The Seattle Mariners drafted him with the first pick overall in the 1981 MLB amateur draft. During a 14-year baseball career, Moore pitched for the Mariners (1982–1988), Oakland Athletics (1989–1992) and the Detroit Tigers (1993–1995).

Moore made his Major League Baseball debut on April 11, 1982, and played his final game on August 31, 1995. His career concluded with a regular season win–loss record of 161–176 with a 4.39 earned run average (ERA), 79 complete games, and 16 shutouts in 450 games pitched ( innings pitched). Moore's finest season arguably came in 1989 with Oakland, when he set career bests with 19 wins, a 2.61 ERA and a .219 batting average against. He was elected to the American League All-Star team that year and finished third in AL Cy Young Award voting.

Moore played for the Athletics in two World Series. He was a member of the A's team that swept the San Francisco Giants in the 1989 World Series, starting and winning two of the four games, and hitting a double as well. He was also on the A's team that lost to the Cincinnati Reds in the 1990 World Series.  In five postseason series, Moore made seven career starts and compiled a 4–3 won-loss record with a 3.29 ERA.

References

External links

Baseball players from Oklahoma
1959 births
Living people
People from Caddo County, Oklahoma
Oral Roberts Golden Eagles baseball players
American League All-Stars
Oakland Athletics players
Seattle Mariners players
Detroit Tigers players
Major League Baseball pitchers
Lynn Sailors players
Salt Lake City Gulls players